The Si Stebbins stack is a cyclic mathematical card stack. It was popularized by the magician Si Stebbins, and can be constructed from a standard 52-card deck. Frequently used in card magic, its properties allow the position and value of each card in a deck to be determined.

Order of stack 

Each card in a Si Stebbins stack alternates suit in the CHaSeD order (Clubs Hearts Spades Diamonds), and has a numerical value three greater than the preceding card. The Aces are given the numerical value of 1 and the Jack, Queen, and King of each suit are given the values 11, 12, and 13 respectively.

The deck stack is considered cyclic as any card in the deck can be used to determine the value and position of any other card in the deck. The bottom card of the deck is in order with the top card of the deck making the order of cards an endlessly repeating cycle. A deck in Si Stebbins order can be cut any number of times without disturbing the order.

Arranging a deck in Si Stebbins order 

Using the stack to determine a selected card
The value of a card selected from a deck in Si Stebbins order can be determined by the card immediately preceding or following it.

In Card Tricks And The Way They Are Performed Stebbins instructs the performer to have a card selected and cut the cards above the selection to the bottom of the deck. Then, by looking at the bottom card, the spectators selection can be revealed.

History 
Mathematical card stacks in which each card's value progresses by 3, 4, or 5 are detailed in magic literature as early as the 16th Century.

The system was originally published in the United States in Boston or New York City around 1898 by Si Stebbins (real name William Coffrin), in a pamphlet titled Si Stebbins' Card Tricks And The Way He Performs Them and a later edition Card Tricks And The Way They Are Performed.

Despite contrary claims, Stebbins maintained that the stack was his invention:

Howard Thurston claimed to have invented the system in his 1903 book Howard Thurston's Card Tricks referring to it as "The 'Thurston' System of Expert Card Manipulation" and thanking Stebbins "...for many valuable 
suggestions and ideas with regard to its conception." 

The card stack is generally known as Si Stebbins today, and is referred to as such in many card magic books including The Encyclopedia of Card Tricks and Expert Card Technique.

References

External links
Card Tricks and the Way They Are Performed, undated, by Si Stebbins at Internet Archive
Howard Thurston's Card Tricks, 1903, by Howard Thurston at Google Books

Card tricks
Mentalism